The 2011 AFC U-16 Women's Championship was the 4th edition of the AFC U-16 Women's Championship. The top 3 teams qualify for the 2012 FIFA U-17 Women's World Cup.

Venues
The host city was Nanjing in Jiangsu, China. The Final round was played on the following stadiums.

 Nanjing Olympic Sports Center
 Jiangning Sports Center

Qualification

There were two qualification rounds to determine one additional place for the final round, for which five teams were automatically qualified.

Final tournament
The final round will be played as a single round-robin tournament from 3–13 November 2011.

Winners

Awards

Goalscorers 
9 goals
 Ri Un-sim

3 goals

 Mizuki Nakamura
 Rika Masuya
 Ri Kyong-hyang

2 goals

 Adriana Jones
 Lei Jiahui
 Song Duan
 Wang Yaping
 Zhang Chen
 Akari Shiraki
 Yui Narumiya
 Kim So-yi
 Namgung Ye-ji

1 goal

 Lauren Ann Brown
 Breanna Jane Sampson
 Ji Xinyi
 Lyu Yueyun
 Song Yuqing
 Arisa Matsubara
 Ayaka Inoue
 Ruka Norimatsu
 Miki Hirata
 Miki Itō
 Yuka Momiki
 Yuka Toriumi
 Lim Hee-eun
 Kim So-yi
 Yoon Ji-hyun
 Kim So-hyang
 Ri Kyong-hyang

Own goal
 Pannaray Suyao (playing against Japan)

References

External links
 Official tournament website

2011 in Asian football
2011
2011
Afc
2011 in Chinese football
2011 in Japanese women's football
2011 in North Korean football
2011 in South Korean football
2011–12 in Australian women's soccer
2011 in Thai football
2011 in youth sport
2011 in youth association football
November 2011 sports events in China